Damnae station is a closed station. It was on the Gyeongchun Line.

Defunct railway stations in South Korea
Transport in Namyangju
Railway stations opened in 1970
Railway stations closed in 1974